Dichorda rhodocephala is a moth of the family Geometridae first described by Louis Beethoven Prout in 1916. It is found on Jamaica.

References

Moths described in 1916
Geometrinae